Propebela bergensis is a species of sea snail, a marine gastropod mollusk in the family Mangeliidae.

Description
The length of the shell varies between 7.5 mm and 9 mm.

(Original description) The characteristics are close to Propebela rugulata. The spire is somewhat longer than the aperture, and the axial ribs are more numerous than in the typical form.. The apex is obtusely rounded. The first whorl has 3–4 spiral ribs. The operculum is not materially different from the typical one. The teeth, which I have most frequently found, are like those illustrated in the figure with the deep recessment in the side, but the structure differing materially from it occasionally appears.

Distribution
This marine species occurs off the Faroes, in the Barents Sea and off Southwest Sweden

References

 Bogdanov I. (1990). Mollusks of Oenopotinae Subfamily (Gastropoda, Pectinibranchia, Turridae) in the seas of the USSR. Leningrad 221 p
 Gofas, S.; Le Renard, J.; Bouchet, P. (2001). Mollusca. in: Costello, M.J. et al. (eds), European Register of Marine Species: a check-list of the marine species in Europe and a bibliography of guides to their identification. Patrimoines Naturels. 50: 180–213

External links
 Locard A. (1897–1898). Expéditions scientifiques du Travailleur et du Talisman pendant les années 1880, 1881, 1882 et 1883. Mollusques testacés. Paris, Masson. vol. 1 [1897], p. 1–516 pl. 1-22; vol. 2 [1898], p. 1–515, pl. 1-18
 
 MNHN, Paris: Propebela bergensis

bergensis
Gastropods described in 1886